Moskva is the second and final studio album by Russian pop group Glukoza. After the album was released Natasha Ionova left the group to start a solo career.

Track listing
 "Швайне" – 4:25
 "Снег Идёт" – 3:58
 "Горилла" – 5:01
 "К Чёрту" – 5:14
 "Юра" – 3:26
 "Москва" – 5:46
 "Пипец"  – 3:08
 "Корабли" – 3:48
 "Ой-Ой" – 3:39
 "Карина" – 3:36

Bonus tracks
 "Москва" (version 2/Music Video)
 "Юра" (version 2/Music Video)
 "Швайне" (version 2/Music Video)

Use in other media
The song "Schweine" is featured in the video game, Grand Theft Auto IV, on Vladivostok FM, but was removed from the tenth anniversary release due to the expiration of the licensing with Rockstar.

References

2005 albums
Glukoza albums